Ano Lechonia is a town in the Magnesia regional unit, Greece. Ano Lechonia was the seat of the former municipality of Artemida. The population of the village in 2011 was 1,068, the population of the community (including the coastal village Platinidia) was 1,429.

Population

History
The name Lechonia may come from the Slavic word lech meaning "field". Historians say it was the ancient city Methone. At the hill named Nevestiki the ruins of an ancient wall have been found.  The residents of Methone supported the Argonauts with ships. After four centuries of Ottoman rule, Ano Lechonia became part of Greece in 1881, as a consequence of the transfer of Thessaly to Greece following the Treaty of Berlin (1878). It was connected by a railway to Volos in 1895.

See also
List of settlements in the Magnesia regional unit

References

External links
 Ano Lechonia on GTP Travel Pages

Populated places in Magnesia (regional unit)